The 2018–19 New Mexico State Aggies women's basketball team represented New Mexico State University during the 2018–19 NCAA Division I women's basketball season. The Aggies, led by second year head coach Brooke Atkinson, played their home games at the Pan American Center and are members of the Western Athletic Conference. They finished the season 26–7, 15–1 in WAC play to win the regular season WAC championship. They defeated Chicago State, UMKC and Texas–Rio Grande Valley to be champions of the WAC women's tournament. They received an automatic bid to the NCAA women's tournament where they lost in the first round to Iowa State.

Roster

Schedule

|-
!colspan=9 style=| Non-conference regular season

|-
!colspan=9 style=| WAC regular season

|-
!colspan=9 style=| WAC Women's Tournament

|-
!colspan=9 style=| NCAA Women's Tournament

See also
2018–19 New Mexico State Aggies men's basketball team

References

New Mexico State Aggies women's basketball seasons
New Mexico State
New Mexico State